Matthew Dodge Nokes (born October 31, 1963) is an American former professional baseball catcher and designated hitter. He played 11 seasons in Major League Baseball for the San Francisco Giants (1985), the Detroit Tigers (1986–1990), New York Yankees (1990–1994), the Baltimore Orioles, and the Colorado Rockies (1995). He batted left-handed and threw right-handed. He also had experience at first base, third base, and left and right fields.

Playing career
Nokes was drafted by the Giants in the 20th round of the 1981 amateur draft. He debuted in the major leagues on September 3, 1985, against the visiting Philadelphia Phillies, collecting two hits in four at bats. In 1987, his rookie year, he had his finest statistical season, batting .289, hitting 32 home runs, (at the time a record for a rookie catcher) and driving in 87 runs. In that year, he was elected to the American League All-Star Game roster, won the Silver Slugger Award, selected to the Topps Rookie All-Star team, and finished third in voting for the American League Rookie of the Year award. He was also named the Tigers Rookie of The Year by the Detroit Sports Media Association.

Following his major league career, Matt Nokes played for the St. Paul Saints of the Northern League in 1998 and 1999, with a brief two-game stint with the now-defunct Cafeteros de Córdoba team of the Mexican League. He spent 2001 as a player/coach for the Schaumburg Flyers and managed the Joliet Jackhammers of the Northern League in 2002 and 2003.

After retirement from professional baseball, Nokes returned to his hometown San Diego area where he currently owns an instructional consultation practice for serious hitters and advises software and equipment companies.

While with the Yankees, Nokes caught Jim Abbott's no-hitter on September 4, 1993.

Plane incident
On February 19, 2000, Matt Nokes, who had just signed a minor league contract with the Cleveland Indians, was forced to land a plane he was piloting on Interstate 15 in northern San Diego County. Nokes said that the plane lost oil pressure and that he couldn't reach an airport.

"I went south, hovered over some cars, and waited until they cleared", he said.

Nokes later sold the plane. On April 2, 2016, the man he sold it to, Dennis Hogge, crash landed it on the same highway. The plane struck a vehicle that had stopped on the side of the road, killing a passenger in that vehicle and injuring five others, including Hogge.

Career statistics

His only postseason appearance was in the 1987 American League Championship Series, batting only .143 (2-for-14) with 1 home run and 2 RBI.

References

External links

1963 births
Living people
Albany-Colonie Yankees players
American expatriate baseball players in Mexico
American League All-Stars
Baseball players from San Diego
Baltimore Orioles players
Cafeteros de Córdoba players
Clinton Giants players
Colorado Rockies players
Colorado Springs Sky Sox players
Columbus Clippers players
Detroit Tigers players
Fresno Giants players
Great Falls Giants players
Joliet JackHammers players
Major League Baseball catchers
Nashville Sounds players
New York Yankees players
Northern League (baseball, 1993–2010) managers
San Francisco Giants players
Schaumburg Flyers players
Shreveport Captains players
Silver Slugger Award winners
St. Paul Saints players